The Heaðobards (Old English: Heaðubeardan, Old Low German: Headubarden, "war-beards") were possibly a branch of the Langobards, and their name may be preserved in toponym Bardengau, in Lower Saxony, Germany.

They are mentioned in both Beowulf and in Widsith, where they are in conflict with the Danes. However, in the Norse tradition the Heaðobards had apparently been forgotten and the conflict is instead rendered as a family feud, or as a conflict with the Saxons, where the Danes take the place of the Heaðobards.

Beowulf 
In Beowulf, the Heaðobards are involved in a war with the Danes. When Beowulf reports on his adventure in Denmark to his king Hygelac, he mentions that Hroðgar had a daughter, Freawaru. Since Froda had been killed by the Danes, Hroðgar sent Freawaru to marry Ingeld, in an unsuccessful attempt to end the feud. An old warrior urged the Heaðobards to revenge, and Beowulf predicts to Hygelac that Ingeld will turn against his father-in-law Hroðgar. In a version given in the Danish chronicle Gesta Danorum, the old warrior appears as Starkad, and he succeeded in making Ingeld divorce his bride and in turning him against her family. Earlier in the Beowulf poem, the poet tells us that the hall Heorot was eventually destroyed by fire, see quote (Gummere's translation):
 

It is tempting to interpret the new war with Ingeld as leading to the burning of the hall of Heorot, as Sophus Bugge did, but the poem separates the two events (by a ne wæs hit lenge þā meaning "nor far way was that day when", in Gummere's translation).

Widsith 
Whereas Beowulf never dwells on the outcome of the battle with Ingeld, the possibly older poem Widsith refers to Hroðgar and Hroðulf defeating the Heaðobards at Heorot:

References

Early Germanic peoples
English heroic legends
Migration Period